Frank Coraci (born February 3, 1966) is an American film director and screenwriter best known for his work with actor Adam Sandler.

Biography
Coraci was born in Shirley, New York. In 1984 he graduated from William Floyd High School, where he was on the wrestling team for several years. In 1988 he graduated from New York University's Tisch School of the Arts. He has directed three successful films with Adam Sandler (The Wedding Singer, The Waterboy and Click) and several music videos for the actor. He worked as an actor in Sandler's video clip "The Lonesome Kicker", playing the character that gives the song its name.

He directed the movie Around the World in 80 Days, starring Jackie Chan, which turned out to be a box office flop, grossing only $24 million in the U.S. (made on a budget of $110 million).

Coraci also directed Zookeeper, a romantic comedy starring Kevin James and Rosario Dawson that was released in 2011.

Filmography
Film

Television

Actor

References

External links

1966 births
Film directors from New York (state)
American people of Italian descent
Living people
Tisch School of the Arts alumni
People from Shirley, New York
Screenwriters from New York (state)
Comedy film directors